California nut crimes refers to the organised theft of nuts (almonds, pistachios, cashews, and pecans) in California. Reported cases of nut theft go as far back as 2006 with the worth of stolen nuts being millions of dollars. The thefts are sophisticated in nature involving identity theft and a knowledge of computer security and logistics.

Background 

Theft of food by organised criminal organisations has targeted a variety of food items in the past including oysters, bourbon, honey and Parmesan cheese. Theft of nuts is appealing to criminals because nuts have high market value all over the world, they have a good shelf life and they can't be traced using serial numbers or electronic means. Stealing nuts is non-violent and possession of nuts is also not illegal itself. California produces 80% of the world's almonds, 99% of America's, and is the world's second largest producer of pistachios and walnuts. California's nut industry makes over $9 billion a year.

Method 
The majority of nut thefts were pickup frauds without any violence or damage to property. Methods used involve using fake trucks, scout trucks, fraudulent paperwork and getting information off the U.S. Department of Transportation website. Authentic trucking drivers would be hired for transporting the goods to warehouses, without actually knowing they were part of a theft. FBI agent Dan Bryant said the thefts and fraud were conducted by 'sophisticated people'. Other than the petty theft of nuts, large-scale nut crimes involve organised criminals who understand "the trucking business, identity theft, and computer security". The thefts have been reported from areas in California such as the San Joaquin valley. Authorities believe that some of the nuts are shipped abroad. A good grasp of the shipping business and procurement of false shipping papers can result in the stolen nuts being shipped to other parts of the world. A single case can involve the theft of nuts worth up to $500,000.

Frequency 
National Public Radio (NPR) reported cases of nut theft in California in 2006. In 2009, one incident of nut theft was reported to the US Department of Justice. Between 2013 and 2017 at least 35 truckloads of nuts worth about $10 million was reported stolen. From four incidents in 2012 worth about half-a-million US dollars, nut crime rose to 31 reported incidents in 2015 valued at almost $4.5 million. This rose to over $10 million worth of nuts stolen from central California during the end of 2015 and beginning of 2016.

Response 
The nut industry has sought various measures against the thefts including the fingerprinting and photographing of truckers, verifying vehicle information and using RFID tags. Law enforcement monitors by air as well as on the ground. A few drivers have been arrested but the thefts continue. A trucker was given a fake driver’s licence as well as directions as to where to pick up the almonds and where to deliver them. When he was arrested it was found out that he only accepted the job because he needed the $180 offered. Law enforcement knows the "bigger fish" are still out there. Armenian Power, a criminal group in Los Angeles, have been linked to the crimes. California almond theft has also been linked to Pakistani terror funding.

In popular culture 
Marc Fennell created an audiobook about the California nut crimes titled Nut Jobs: Cracking California's Strangest $10 Million Dollar Heist.

References 

Theft
Agriculture in California
Organized crime in California
Food theft